Murry may refer to:

People

Given name
 Murry Bartow (born 1961), American basketball coach
 Murry Bowden (born 1949), American football player
 Murry Dickson (1916–1989), American baseball player
 Murry Hope (1929–2012), English writer and occultist
 Murry R. Nelson (born 1947), American professor of Education and American studies
 Murry S. King (1870–1927), American architect
 Murry Salby, American atmospheric scientist
 Murry Sidlin (born 1940), American conductor and professor
 Murry Wilson (1917–1973), American musician, record producer, and businessman

Surname
 Charles Wallace Murry Madeleine L'Engle fictional character
 Don Murry (1899-1951), American football player
 George V. Murry (1948-2020), American Roman Catholic bishop
 John Murry (musician), American indie musician
 John Middleton Murry, English writer
 John Middleton Murry Jr. (also known as Colin Murry), English writer
 Meg Murry Madeleine L'Engle fictional character
 Paul Murry, artist who worked for Walt Disney's Comics and Stories
 Sandy and Dennys Murry, Madeleine L'Engle fictional characters

Places
 Murry, Wisconsin, United States, a town
 Murry (community), Wisconsin, United States, an unincorporated community

See also
List of Irish-language given names
 Murray (disambiguation)
 Mury (disambiguation)
Maury (disambiguation)